Ormetica latania is a moth of the family Erebidae. It was described by Herbert Druce in 1890. It is found in Colombia, Venezuela and Costa Rica.

Subspecies
Ormetica latania latania (Colombia)
Ormetica latania vulcanica (Seitz, 1921) (Costa Rica)

References

Ormetica
Moths described in 1890